John Kadlecik (born June 28, 1969 in Council Bluffs, Iowa) is an American guitarist. He was a founding member as the lead guitarist for the Grateful Dead tribute band, Dark Star Orchestra, in 1997. From 2009 to 2014 he performed with original Dead members Bob Weir and Phil Lesh in Furthur.

Early life
John Kadlecik's mother is a visual artist and his father a city manager. Because of this, his family moved every few years in his early life. He lived in Omaha, Cincinnati and Davenport where he began studying classical violin before his family relocated to the Chicago area. In high school he became interested in improvisation and he began teaching himself guitar.

Musical career
Kadlecik played in several garage bands throughout high school before he became interested in jazz and folk music. In 1990 he began performing regularly with a Chicago area folk-rock band called Uncle Buffalo's Urban Mountain Review before joining Hairball Willie in 1991. With John on guitar, violin, and vocals, Hairball Willie performed around the Midwest and released several recordings, including a full length studio CD, Just Defying Gravity. He then had a brief stint with a Grateful Dead tribute band called Uncle John's Band in 1996 before forming his own group called Wingnut.

In 1997, he co-founded the Dark Star Orchestra, which was originally intended to be a one night a week Dead cover band formed by deadhead musicians. Before long all the group members quit their other projects and began concentrating on the group full-time. Since then John has been noted for his abilities to emulate Jerry Garcia's playing and singing abilities.  On several occasions former members of the Grateful Dead have joined Kadlecik and the Dark Star Orchestra on stage.

In 2003, Kadlecik began performing occasionally with Melvin Seals in several tributes to the music of the Jerry Garcia Band. This led ultimately to the formation of the Mix with Melvin Seals, Greg Anton, Jeff Pevar, and Kevin Rosen. The Mix signed a recording contract with Rainman Records and released a full-length CD, American Spring, which featured two of Greg Anton's songwriting collaborations with Robert Hunter sung by Kadlecik as well as two of John's Hairball Willie songs co-written with lyricist Eric Olson.

In August 2009, Kadlecik joined Grateful Dead members Bob Weir and Phil Lesh in their band Furthur. On November 16, 2009 John announced that he was officially leaving Dark Star Orchestra to concentrate his time on Furthur. His final performance with Dark Star Orchestra was on December 5, 2009 in Buffalo, New York.

In addition to his work with Dark Star Orchestra and Furthur, Kadlecik has continued to perform on his own in the Washington D.C. area, both solo acoustic and as the leader of small bands, including projects like Firewheel. On April 11, 2010, John debuted the John K Band in Washington, D.C., performing his original songs, written with lyricists Eric Olson and Indi Riverflow, as well as songs by the Grateful Dead, the Jerry Garcia Band, Phish, and others.  He has also played with Oteil Burbridge's band Oteil and the Peacemakers.

After the final Dead performances, where Trey Anastasio was chosen to play lead guitar in favor of Kadlecik (Fare Thee Well), he was invited back to play a few shows with Phil Lesh & Friends at Terrapin Crossroads in San Rafael, CA.

Personal life

As of 2010, Kadlecik was living in Takoma Park, Maryland.

References

External links
Official website
ReverbNation website
John Kadelcik Joins Furthur: Dead.net
JamBase Article: John Kadelcik Weighs In on Fare Thee Well
John Kadlecik feature interview on The Sound Podcast with Ira Haberman

American rock guitarists
American male guitarists
1969 births
Living people
Furthur (band) members
20th-century American guitarists
20th-century American male musicians
Dark Star Orchestra members